The Bangladesh Infantry Regiment (BIR) is an infantry regiment (regimental system type) of the Bangladesh Army. It was raised in 2001 as the second combat regiment after the East Bengal Regiment. The regiment was raised initially by transferring units of the East Bengal Regiment to the new Bangladesh Infantry Regiment centre, before its own recruits were trained. This regiment was the first new unit raised by Bangladesh Army in the 21st Century, and consequently is also known as the Regiment of the Millennium.

Role
Its stated role is to seek out, close with and destroy the enemy, within a traditional infantry combat scenario, however, the regiment also provides aid to the civilian government when called upon and also contributes regularly to Bangladesh's peacekeeping commitments overseas. The regiment deployed eight Regiments to Bangladesh's UN peacekeeping commitments:
 MONUC
 2 Bangladesh Infantry Regiment
 17th Bangladesh Infantry Regiment
 UNOCI
 16th Bangladesh Infantry Regiment
 18th Bangladesh Infantry Regiment
 19th Bangladesh Infantry Regiment
 UNMIL
 12th Bangladesh Infantry Regiment
 13th Bangladesh Infantry Regiment
 14th Bangladesh Infantry Regiment
 UNAMIS
 8th Bangladesh Infantry Regiment

See also
 East Bengal Regiment
 25th Bangladesh Infantry Regiment

References

External links

Regiments of Bangladesh
Military units and formations established in 2001
2001 establishments in Bangladesh